Holme Bay is a bay in Antarctica in Mac. Holme Bay is largely snow-free and was mapped by Norwegian cartographers from aerial photographs taken by the Lars Christensen Expedition in January-February 1937, and named Holmevika because of its island-studded character (holme means "islet" in Norwegian) .

The Rouse and Bay Islands
 Azimuth Islands
 Flat Islands
 Béchervaise Island
 West Budd Island
 Giganteus Island
 Jocelyn Islands
 Nelson Rock
 Rookery Islands
 Rouse Islands
 Welch Island
 Williams Rocks

See also
 List of Antarctic islands south of 60° S
 Mawson Station

References

External links 

  Partial map of Holme Bay
   
   
   
   

Bays of Antarctica
Oases of Antarctica